Dorrington railway station was a station in Dorrington, Shropshire, England. The station was opened in 1852 and closed in 1958.

On the site of the station's goods yard, which is located just to the east of the village, is now an oil depot and a plant hire depot.

References

Further reading

Disused railway stations in Shropshire
Railway stations in Great Britain opened in 1852
Railway stations in Great Britain closed in 1958
Former Shrewsbury and Hereford Railway stations